History of Dianetics begins around 1950. During the late 1940s, L. Ron Hubbard began developing a mental therapy system which he called Dianetics. Hubbard had tried to interest the medical profession in his techniques, including the Gerontological Society, the Journal of the American Medical Association, and the American Journal of Psychiatry, but his work was rejected for not containing sufficient evidence of efficacy to be acceptable.

In April 1950, he published his ideas in Astounding Science Fiction where he was well-known as a science fiction writer. The article generated a lot of interest and the following month Hubbard published the book Dianetics: The Modern Science of Mental Health. The book brought in money and Hubbard began teaching courses through the Hubbard Dianetic Research Foundation.

The scientific and medical communities were critical of Dianetics — the American Psychological Association called on psychologists to not use the techniques and complaints were made against local Dianetics practitioners for allegedly practicing medicine without a license. Financial problems ensued, but despite the influx of financial support from some wealthy followers, the first foundations resulted in bankruptcy and the loss of the name and copyrights to Dianetics.

Around 1952, Hubbard went on to create Scientology, eventually regaining the rights to Dianetics which he incorporated into Scientology. Today, Dianetics is a part of Scientology and is used as a beginning promotion to new people.

Origins

The ideas of Dianetics originated in unpublished research L. Ron Hubbard supposedly performed in the 1920s and 1930s. He recorded the results and his conclusions in an unpublished 1938 manuscript, Excalibur, the contents of which formed the basis for some of his later publications.

After Hubbard's service in the United States Navy during World War II, he was admitted to the Oak Knoll Naval Hospital in Oakland, California. While there, he claimed to have carried out research into endocrinology "to determine whether or not structure monitors function or function monitors structure ... using nothing but Freudian Psychoanalysis and using a park bench as a consulting room", spending a great deal of time in the hospital's library, where he would have encountered the work of Sigmund Freud and other psychoanalysts.

The emergence of Dianetics

In January 1949, Hubbard informed his literary agent, Forrest J. Ackerman, that he was writing a book on the "cause and cure of nervous tension", which he was going to call either The Dark Sword or Excalibur or Science of the Mind, and assured Ackerman that the book had "more selling and publicity angles than any book of which I have ever heard". In the same month, he told Writers' Markets and Methods magazine that he was working on a "book of psychology".

In April 1949, Hubbard told the Gerontological Society at Baltimore City Hospital that he was preparing a paper with the somewhat unwieldy title of Certain Discoveries and Researches Leading to the Removal of Early Traumatic Experiences Including Attempted Abortion, Birth Shock and Infant Illnesses and Accidents with an Examination of their Effects Physiological and Psychological and their Potential Influence on Longevity on the Adult Individual with an Account of the Techniques Evolved and Employed. Hubbard's letter was "politely received", but the Society apparently declined involvement. He also wrote to the American Medical Association and the American Psychiatric Association. These letters, and their responses, have not been published, though Hubbard later said that they had been negative.

In 1949, Hubbard told his friend John W. Campbell, the editor of Astounding Science Fiction magazine and publisher of many of Hubbard's short stories, about his work. Campbell had been one of Hubbard's early test subjects and believed that Hubbard's techniques had cured his persistent sinusitis, so he was an enthusiastic supporter. In a letter to one of Astounding's contributors, Jack Williamson, he wrote: "I know dianetics is one of, if not the greatest, discovery of all Man's written and unwritten history. It produces the sort of stability and sanity men have dreamed about for centuries."

In July 1949, Campbell wrote to another contributor, Joseph A. Winter, a physician from Michigan. Winter was intrigued by Campbell's claims about Hubbard's work, but initially skeptical; Hubbard sent him what he called "an operator's manual for your use" which convinced Winter that Dianetics had some promise. Winter later wrote:

With cooperation from some institutions, some psychiatrists, he  has worked on all types of cases. Institutionalized schizophrenics, apathies, manics, depressives, perverts, stuttering, neuroses - in all, nearly 1000 cases. But just a brief sampling of each type; he doesn't have proper statistics in the usual sense. But he has one statistic. He has cured every patient he worked with. He has cured ulcers, arthritis, asthma.

In October 1949, Winter, Hubbard, and Campbell met at Hubbard's home in Bay Head, New Jersey, to continue work. Winter attempted to interest some medical colleagues and psychiatrists in Dianetics, with little success, and suggested to Hubbard that he publish an article to stimulate interest in his work. Perhaps mindful of the rejection of his earlier efforts, Hubbard told Winter that "the articles you suggest would be more acceptable coming from another pen than mine." Accordingly, in late 1949, Winter wrote a paper "giving a brief resumé of the principles and methodology of dianetic therapy" which he submitted informally to an editor of the Journal of the American Medical Association. However, the editor told Winter that "the paper as written did not contain sufficient evidence of efficacy to be acceptable and was, moreover, better suited to one of the journals which dealt with psychotherapy." He revised the paper, added case histories provided by Hubbard, and submitted it to the American Journal of Psychiatry, which rejected it on the same grounds.

According to the Church of Scientology, Hubbard issued his early research in the form of a manuscript entitled Dianetics: The Original Thesis in 1948; Hubbard gives the year as 1949. It received a wider public release in 1951 and is now published as the book The Dynamics of Life. The original text is not available for comparison with the 1951 publication, but it may have comprised the "operator's manual" written by Hubbard for Winter, which is the first independently attested codification of Dianetics.

Dianetics in print

At the end of 1949, Hubbard and Campbell agreed to announce Dianetics in the upcoming May issue of Astounding, to be followed by a full-length book.  Campbell arranged for Hermitage House, a small New York City medical and psychiatric textbook publisher, to publish the book. Hubbard also published an article in The Explorers Journal called "Terra Incognita: The Mind". Dianetics was not quite finished at this stage; engrams were called comanomes, a neologism proposed by Winter that was later abandoned.

In April 1950, Hubbard, Campbell, Winter and several others established a Hubbard Dianetic Research Foundation in Elizabeth, New Jersey to coordinate work related to the forthcoming publication. Hubbard wrote Dianetics: The Modern Science of Mental Health at that time, allegedly completing the 180,000-word book in six weeks. 

Hubbard first published his ideology of mental health techniques in the third week of April 1950 in Astounding, followed by publishing as a book in May 1950. It quickly sold out its first run of 8,000 copies. Only two months after the book's publication, Newsweek reported that over 55,000 copies had been sold and enthusiasts had established 500 Dianetics clubs across the United States. In July, Time magazine reported that it was climbing the U.S. bestseller lists. Campbell reported in the August 1950 Astounding that the magazine was receiving up to a thousand letters a week about Dianetics. Sales reached 150,000 copies by the end of the year.

Campbell's endorsement had proven invaluable; Astounding Science Fiction had over 150,000 readers, many of whom were familiar with Hubbard's science fiction and had a strong interest in new scientific discoveries. Among the wider population, Dianetics gained popularity as a cheaper, simpler and apparently more effective means of self-improvement than conventional psychotherapies. Hubbard's optimistic view that Dianetics could alleviate the Cold War climate of tension and fear also struck a chord. One of his supporters, Frederick L. Schuman, wrote in a letter to The New York Times that "History has become a race between Dianetics and catastrophe".

The success of Dianetics brought in a flood of money. Hubbard offered teaching courses for Dianetic "auditors" through the Hubbard Dianetic Research Foundation, costing $500 per person for four to six weeks of instruction and thirty-six hours of Dianetic therapy. Hubbard recruited his friend and fellow science fiction writer A. E. van Vogt to act as the Foundation's treasurer, and five other Foundations were soon established in Washington, DC, New York City, Chicago, Los Angeles and Honolulu. The Foundation's Los Angeles property alone was valued at $4.5 million.

Opposition to Dianetics

The scientific and medical communities were far less enthusiastic about Dianetics, viewing it with bemusement, concern, or outright derision.  Nobel Prize–winning physicist I.I. Rabi, reviewing Dianetics for Scientific American, declared that "this volume probably contains more promises and less evidence per page than has any publication since the invention of printing." He noted that the publication of Dianetics had coincided with that of Worlds in Collision, a notorious work of pseudoscience by Immanuel Velikovsky, with which Dianetics shared the top of the best-seller lists. This, Rabi said, illustrated "the most frightening proof of the confusion of the contemporary mind and its tendency to fall prey to pseudo-scientific concepts."

The Nation pointed out the lack of documentation in Dianetics: "No case histories are offered to substantiate his claims, nor is there documentation of any kind to indicate that any previous thinker, medical or otherwise, ever made a significant contribution to the subject of human behavior." The Individual Psychology Bulletin also criticized Hubbard for "not offer any other evidence than a vague reference to hundreds of cured patients, without furnishing case histories or other specific data. The book is crammed with bragging and swaggering, pseudoscientific bombast, platitudes and vulgarities, and a great deal of sheer nonsense." British health minister Kenneth Robinson, among others, expressed concern at the possible dangers of unskilled amateurs practicing therapy on patients, and skepticism about Hubbard's claims that Dianetics could be effective in dealing with illnesses.

In September 1950, the American Psychological Association issued a resolution calling on psychologists not to use Hubbard's methods for treatment purposes unless and until they had been shown effective through scientific testing. Complaints were made against local Dianetics practitioners for allegedly practicing medicine without a license. This eventually prompted Dianetics advocates to disclaim any medicinal benefits in order to avoid regulation.

Hubbard explained the backlash as a response from various entities trying to co-opt Dianetics for their own use. He claimed that "just about the time  hit the stands" (i.e. April–May 1950), a "very high-ranking officer" of the US Navy had approached him to sound him out about "using what you know about the mind to make people more suggestible." Hubbard apparently avoided this by resigning from the Navy. He also told the FBI in a 1952 interview that "the Soviets apparently realized the value of Dianetics because as early as 1938 an official of Amtorg , while at The Explorers Club in New York, contacted him to suggest that he go to Russia and develop Dianetics there." The FBI agent conducting the interview was not convinced, describing Hubbard as "a mental case".

Hubbard blamed the hostile press coverage in particular on a plot by the American Communist Party, working through the Authors League of America. According to Hubbard,

These people in the early days of Dianetics said, "We can use Dianetics." They were all my friends. Everywhere I looked, every writer I knew who had ever been a member of the Communist Party was right there alongside of me pumping my hand, saying, "Good going, Ron. We knew you had it in you." ... And when they finally got it through their thick skulls in October 1950 that I didn't care to have Dianetics and Scientology covertly used by any other organization on Earth for their own special purposes, Dianetics and Scientology in the public presses had it.

In later years, Hubbard decided that the psychiatric profession was the origin of all of the criticism of Dianetics, as he believed it secretly controlled most of the world's governments. Current church head David Miscavige has also propagated this theory:

At stake were all of  vested interest dollars. How could they get research grants? Millions, or even billions - if the problems of the mind were already solved? And how could they hide the fact of LRH's discoveries if the whole country was talking about them? Their initial attacks have been mentioned over the years by us. First they got "technical reviews" by psychiatrists hatcheting Dianetics. They published these critical reviews in their psychiatric trade magazines ... Then they took these published reviews and handed them out to the press where they were promptly requoted as authority in magazines like "Slime" and "Tripe" .

Fragmentation and transformation

By the autumn of 1950, financial problems had developed. Book sales, lectures and auditor training still generated revenue, but financial controls were lax; Hubbard described the situation as "something on the accounting system of dumping it all in a barrel outside the door and hauling the barrel down to a bank every once in a while". Hubbard's treasurer, A. E. van Vogt, said that Hubbard personally withdrew large sums from Foundation accounts, apparently without any prior notice or explanation of his purpose; van Vogt calculated that, by November 1950 the six Foundations had spent around one million dollars and were more than $200,000 in debt.

Matters were not improved by Hubbard's experiments with a cocktail of benzedrine, vitamins and glutamic acid, called GUK after the rifle cleaning fluid used by the US Marine Corps, which he believed would provide a chemical alternative to auditing. The Foundation purchased a 110-room building in Los Angeles for the project, but Winter writes that it proved a "dismal, expensive failure".

Disagreements emerged over the direction of the Dianetic Foundation's work, and relations between the board members became strained, with several leaving, even to support causes critical of Dianetics. One example was Harvey Jackins, founder of Re-evaluation Counselling, originally a sort of discrete reworking of Dianetics, which L Ron Hubbard later declared suppressive to Scientology. Hubbard's interest in past lives was a particular cause of tension, as he noted in his 1951 book Science of Survival:

The subject of past deaths and past lives is so full of tension that as early as last July (1950-Ed) the board of trustees of the Foundation sought to pass a resolution banning the entire subject. And I have been many times requested to omit any reference to these in the present work or in public for fear that a general impression would get out that Dianetics had something to do with spiritualism.

Winter recorded his dissatisfaction with the state of affairs, believing that "Foundation dianetics was becoming crystallized, ritualistic and sterile", characterized by a "none-too-subtle antagonism towards the medical profession in general and the psychiatric field in particular". He commented that "any attempts to force the medical profession to accept it solely on the basis of the affirmation, 'It works!' and deriding those who request more conclusive proof, is more than likely to jeopardize whatever possible benefits there might be." Having failed to steer the Foundation onto "a more reasoned and conservative basis", he resigned in October 1950. Art Ceppos, the publisher of Dianetics, also resigned at this time, cutting off the Foundation's supply of books; he went on to publish Winter's critical book on Dianetics, A Doctor's Report on Dianetics: Theory and Therapy.

John W. Campbell became dissatisfied as well, accusing Hubbard of "dogmatism and authoritarianism" after the latter insisted that only the Hubbard-approved "Standard Procedure" of Dianetics be used and condemned all other methods as dangerous "Black Dianetics". This was a departure from Hubbard's previously liberal outlook, when he had rejected any attempt to monopolise Dianetics. Campbell resigned from the board in March 1951; although he remained interested in Dianetics for several years afterwards, he eventually moved on to other causes.

The most serious breach occurred with Hubbard's wife Sara, the Foundation's librarian and formerly his personal auditor and research subject. According to Barbara Klowdan, his public relations assistant, both had had affairs—Sara with Miles Hollister, a Dianetics instructor in Los Angeles, and Hubbard with Klowdan herself. Sara was suspended from the Foundation's board of directors and her official post. She filed divorce papers in March 1951, and her claims of "systematic torture" allegedly suffered at Hubbard's hands attracted widespread media attention. A few weeks later, Hubbard told the FBI that Sara had tried to kill him: "I was knocked out, had a needle thrust into my heart to give it a jet of air to produce "coronary thrombosis" and was given an electric shock with a 110 volt current". Hubbard later characterized the suit as "a gal I wasn't even married to was suing me for divorce."

Hubbard appears to have believed that his organization was under sustained attack from Communist interests. From March 2, 1951, all employees of the Dianetic Foundations were "requested to sign a strong oath of loyalty to the U.S. government, a denial of Communism and that their fingerprints be taken and forwarded to the F.B.I." Those who had left the organization, he claimed, were Communist agents; he called Winter a "psycho-neurotic discharged officer of the US Army Medical Corps... Winter seemed to have Communist connections." In one letter to the FBI, he claimed that Ceppos was "connected with Communists" and had tried to obtain the Foundation's mailing list of sixteen thousand names for purposes of distributing Communist literature: in another, he denounced Sara Hubbard and Miles Hollister as "Communist Party members or suspects", describing Hollister as having a "broad forehead, rather Slavic".  He complained that "the Communist Party or members of the Communist Party have in the past year wiped out a half a million operation for me, have cost me my health and have considerably retarded material of interest to the United States Government."

In January 1951, the New Jersey Board of Medical Examiners instituted proceedings against the Hubbard Dianetic Research Foundation in Elizabeth for teaching medicine without a licence. The Foundation closed its doors, causing the proceedings to be vacated, but its creditors began to demand settlement of its outstanding debts. Don Purcell, a millionaire Dianeticist from Wichita, Kansas, offered a brief respite from bankruptcy, but the Foundation's finances failed again in 1952. Because of a sale of assets resulting from the bankruptcy, Hubbard no longer owned the rights to the name "Dianetics", but its philosophical framework still provided the seed for Scientology to grow.

Dianetics in Kansas

A temporary respite from financial difficulties was provided in April 1951 by Don Purcell, a millionaire Dianeticist from Wichita, Kansas. Purcell bankrolled a new Hubbard Dianetic Research Foundation in Wichita and paid to print a new edition of Dianetics, along with several new Dianetics books -- Self Analysis, Science of Survival, Notes on the Lectures, Advanced Procedure and Axioms and Child Dianetics—and a range of other Dianetics pamphlets and publications.

The new Foundation soon found itself pursued by creditors, however, as the other Foundations collapsed under the weight of unpaid debts. The income of the Wichita Foundation was far more modest than the earlier Foundations had enjoyed, as public interest in Dianetics had waned. Only 112 people attended the first major conference held at Wichita, and only 51 students attended a subsequent lecture series in October 1951. Science writer Martin Gardner observed that "the dianetics craze seems to have burned itself out as quickly as it caught fire".

In 1952, creditors forced the Wichita Foundation into bankruptcy. Hubbard sold his holdings to Purcell for a nominal sum and established a "Hubbard College" on the other side of Wichita, leaving Purcell to sort out the bankruptcy proceedings. The remaining assets of the Foundation, comprising the copyright of all the tapes, books, techniques, processes and paraphernalia of Dianetics, including the name, went to the auction block; Purcell bought them outright, but Hubbard's financial straits were not improved. One of his staff, James Elliot, sent out an appeal on his behalf: "Somehow Mr. Hubbard must get funds to keep Dianetics from being closed down everywhere. ... He is penniless", and wrote of Hubbard's wish to establish a "free school in Phoenix for the rehabilitation of auditors". This school was launched around April 1952 as the Hubbard Association of Scientologists; he could not use the name "Dianetics", as he no longer owned it.

In May 1952, Purcell's Foundation sent its members a set of accounts showing that it had earned $141,821 but was overspent by $63,222. Hubbard responded angrily, alleging that the American Medical Association had paid Purcell $500,000 to wreck Dianetics. He later claimed that the Communist Party had paid Purcell "to do in a Central Organization". On December 16, 1952, Hubbard was arrested in the middle of a lecture for failing to return $9,000 withdrawn from the Wichita Foundation. He eventually settled the debt by paying $1,000 and returning a car that he had borrowed from Purcell. Purcell finally tired of pursuing Hubbard over the bankruptcy and handed back the Dianetics copyrights in 1954.

From Dianetics to Scientology

Dianetics provided the seed from which the philosophical framework of Scientology grew.  Scientologists refer to the book Dianetics: The Modern Science of Mental Health as "Book One". Hubbard referred to his own calendar based on the publication date of Dianetics; a date of "A.D. 13" signifies "Year 13 After Dianetics", or 1963.

In 1952, Hubbard published a new set of teachings as "Scientology, a religious philosophy". Scientology did not replace Dianetics but extended it to cover new areas, augmenting the Dianetic axioms with new, additional, Scientology axioms. Where the goal of Dianetics is to rid the individual of his reactive mind engrams, the stated goal of Scientology is to rehabilitate the individual's spiritual nature so that he may reach his full potential.

In 1975, Dianetics Today was published, an all-inclusive volume of over 1000 pages. The book introduced the use of the E-Meter, the Original Assessment or standardized interview and a rote routine (Referred to as "R3R") for the application of Dianetics. This was known as Standard Dianetics.

In 1978, Hubbard released New Era Dianetics (NED), an e-meter auditing version, and the official step on The Bridge to Total Freedom to attain the level of Clear.

Dianetics today 

Dianetics is part of Scientology, and the Church of Scientology views the original Dianetics techniques as an introduction into Scientology. They promote the book in commercials, and streetside where promotion and recruitment events mix Scientology and Dianetics. Church of Scientology buildings are dual-named as Dianetics Foundations, and Book One auditing services are sold to newcomers. The organization opens outreach locations called Dianetics and Scientology Life Improvement Centers which sell beginning books, show films, and hold introductory classes on topics such as communication and marriage.

In the 1990s, DMSMH was heavily advertised because it was not readily associated with the Scientology's fringe-group image. As of 2001, the Church of Scientology continued to run television advertisements promoting the DMSMH book. In spite of this, an analysis of the approximate annual sales of DMSMH that was based on the Church's published data indicated that 2002 sales of DMSMH were similar to sales levels of the book in the early 1970s, and sales of the book reached its peak in the late 1980s. In 1991, Time magazine, alleged that the Church asked its members to purchase large quantities of the book with their own money, or with money supplied by the Church, for the sole purpose of keeping the book on The New York Times Best Seller list.

References 

D